Millard J. Erickson (24 June 1932), born in Isanti County, Minnesota, is an Evangelical Christian theologian, professor of theology, and author.

Early life and education
He earned a B.A. from the University of Minnesota, a B.D. from Northern Baptist Theological Seminary, an M.A. from the University of Chicago, and a Ph.D. from Northwestern University.

Ministry
Erickson, an ordained Baptist minister, is a fairly conservative and moderately Calvinistic Evangelical Protestant. He is accommodating of non-mainstream views on a number of issues, but one of the most vocal opponents of theological liberalism and progressive trends within Evangelicalism. Erickson is a prominent critic of openness theology as well as postmodern Christianity, including the Emerging Church movement.

Erickson was Professor of Theology at Western Seminary in Portland, Oregon. He was professor of theology and academic dean at Bethel University seminary for many years. He also taught at Baylor University.

In 1998, a Festschrift was published in his honor. New Dimensions in Evangelical Thought : Essays in Honor of Millard J. Erickson included contributions from Timothy George, Stanley J. Grenz, Walter C. Kaiser, Jr., Alister E. McGrath, Roger Nicole, Wolfhart Pannenberg, Clark Pinnock, Thom S. Rainer, and Thomas R. Schreiner.

Works

Books

Articles and Chapters

_ (2017). "Language, Logic, and Trinity: A Critical Examination of the Eternal Subordinationist View of the Trinity". Priscilla Papers. 31 (3): 8-15.

References

1932 births
Living people
University of Minnesota alumni
American Baptist theologians
Writers from Portland, Oregon
Western Seminary
Bethel University (Minnesota) faculty
Baylor University faculty
Northern Baptist Theological Seminary alumni
University of Chicago alumni
Northwestern University alumni